Karachhana is a constituency of the Uttar Pradesh Legislative Assembly covering the city of Karachhana in the Allahabad district of Uttar Pradesh, India.

Karachhana is one of five assembly constituencies in the Allahabad Lok Sabha constituency. Since 2008, this assembly constituency is numbered 260 amongst 403 constituencies.

Election results

2022 
Bharatiya Janta Party candidate Piyush Ranjan Nishad won in 2022 Uttar Pradesh Legislative Assembly election defeating Samajwadi Party candidate Ujjwal Raman Singh by a margin of 9,584 votes.

2017
Samajwadi Party candidate Ujjwal Raman Singh won in 2017 Uttar Pradesh Legislative Elections defeating Bharatiya Janta Party candidate Piyush Ranjan Nishad by a margin of 15,024 votes.

References

External links
 

Assembly constituencies of Uttar Pradesh
Politics of Allahabad district